John Brant Brodie (30 August 1862 – 16 February 1925) was an English footballer who was a pivotal figure in the formative years of Wolverhampton Wanderers.

Brodie attended St Luke's School in Blakenhall, and was a founding figure of the football club that became Wolverhampton Wanderers. He played in the club's first-ever FA Cup tie in 1883, scoring twice in a 4–1 win over Long Eaton Rangers, and first-ever Football League match in September 1888. He also captained the team in the 1889 FA Cup Final, where they lost 0–3 to league champions Preston North End.

Brodie won three England caps, making his debut on 2 March 1889, when he scored - as captain - in a 6–1 win over Ireland at Anfield. His other appearances were against Scotland and, again, Ireland.

He retired from playing in 1891 due to a knee injury and became headmaster of a Wolverhampton school. He later returned to Wolves as a director.

References

External links

1862 births
1925 deaths
Footballers from Wolverhampton
English footballers
England international footballers
English Football League players
Wolverhampton Wanderers F.C. players
Association football forwards
FA Cup Final players